Winfried Ommer (born 6 January 1937) is a German racing cyclist. He rode in the 1959 Tour de France.

References

External links
 

1937 births
Living people
German male cyclists
Place of birth missing (living people)
People from Gütersloh
Sportspeople from Detmold (region)
Cyclists from North Rhine-Westphalia